The discography of Benny Cassette consists of several singles and remixes, a collaboration EP with Chuck Inglish, and numerous songwriting and production credits. He was signed to Kanye West's GOOD Music label in 2013 as a producer. He has written or produced songs and albums for artists like Kanye West, Burna Boy, Miguel, Jacob Banks, Tiana Major9, The Band Perry, and others.

Albums

Collaborations

Singles

As lead artist

Remixes

Songwriting and production

Albums

Songs

References

External links
Official website

Discographies of American artists